Alfred de Marigny (29 March 1910 – 28 January 1998) was a French Mauritian acquitted of the murder of his father-in-law, Sir Harry Oakes.

Biography
Marie Alfred Fouquereaux de Marigny, whose real name was Alfred Fouquereaux, "de Marigny" being his mother's name, was born on 29 March 1910, in Mauritius to a well-off French family. He let people address him as Count, but it is clear that he was not part of a noble family. De Marigny assumed the French title of count from his mother's side of the family.

Sir Harry Oakes murder case
De Marigny married Sir Harry Oakes's daughter, Nancy, the day after her 18th birthday. It was de Marigny's third marriage; both of the first two were also to wealthy women who broke off those relationships soon after marriage. 
When Sir Harry was murdered on 7 July 1943, de Marigny was the main suspect and was arrested shortly after. At his trial, detectives which the Duke of Windsor, then Governor of the Bahamas, had brought in from Miami claimed to have found de Marigny's fingerprint near the bed of Sir Harry Oakes. The defense argued that the fingerprint had been lifted and placed in the bedroom. Nancy Oakes supported her husband throughout the trial and testified on his behalf. 

The jury acquitted de Marigny of the murder charge but gave a recommendation that he was an "undesirable alien" and should be removed from the island. The deportation recommendation is rumored to have been influenced by his unpopularity among the ruling class on the island. (The Duke of Windsor had described de Marigny as "an unscrupulous adventurer [with] an evil reputation for immoral conduct with young girls".) Following his deportation, the de Marignys settled in Cuba before separating in 1949.

Several books have been written about the case, including one by de Marigny himself. Many theories have been advanced, including suspected mob involvement, but the Nassau newspaper editor John Marquis insisted in his book Blood and Fire (published in 2005) that the murder was strictly a local affair, planned by wealthy Nassau whites to prevent Oakes from moving his money to Mexico. It implicated Sir Harold Christie in the plot and blamed the Duke of Windsor for orchestrating a cover-up by importing two crooked Miami detectives to conduct the investigation.

Marriage and children
De Marigny was married four times:
Lucie-Alice Cahen for four months in 1937
Ruth Fahnestock Schermerhorn (1937-?)
Nancy Oakes (1942–1949)
Mary Morgan-Taylor (1952–1998)

His fourth marriage was the only one to produce children (three sons).

Later life
De Marigny went to Canada toward the end of World War II and enlisted in the Canadian Army in July 1945. He lived in Quebec for three years before being deported. He spent various amounts of time in the United States, Jamaica, Haiti and the US again before finally moving to Central America.

He died in Houston, Texas, He was survived by his wife, Mary; sons Morgan and John; grandchildren William, Alexandra, Elizabeth, George, Charlotte, and Mary Catherine.  He was preceded in death by his son, Philip deMarigny.

Published works
More Devil Than Saint (Bernard Ackerman, 1946)
A Conspiracy of Crowns with Mickey Herskowitz (Bantam/Crown, 1990)

Biography
 Blood and Fire by John Marquis (LMH Publishing, 2005)
A Serpent in Eden by James Owen (Little, Brown, 2005)

References

1910 births
Mauritian people of French descent
People acquitted of murder
1998 deaths
Canadian Army personnel
Mauritian emigrants to Canada

es:Alfred de Marigny#top